Leopoldas Alfonsas Kepalas (1913–1981) was a Lithuanian basketball player. He won gold medal with Lithuania national basketball team during EuroBasket 1937.

References

1913 births
1981 deaths
FIBA EuroBasket-winning players
Lithuanian men's basketball players